Oļegs Pyotrovich Antropovs (born 5 November 1947) is a Latvian former volleyball player who competed for the Soviet Union in the 1968 Summer Olympics.

He was born in Noviy, Kazakh SSR and played for Burevestnik Alma-Ata and Elektrotechnika Riga.

In 1968 he was part of the Soviet team which won the gold medal in the Olympic tournament. He played four matches.

In 1998 - head coach of men's national team of Russia, which became the silver medalist FIVB Volleyball World League.

After 1999, he worked for nine years in Japan with the club  Jay-T (Hiroshima), repeatedly won medals of the national championship and the Emperor's Cup.

References

External links
 
 

1947 births
Living people
Latvian men's volleyball players
Soviet men's volleyball players
Kazakhstani men's volleyball players
Olympic volleyball players of the Soviet Union
Volleyball players at the 1968 Summer Olympics
Olympic gold medalists for the Soviet Union
Olympic medalists in volleyball
People from Turkistan Region
Coaches of Russia men's national volleyball team
Medalists at the 1968 Summer Olympics
Burevestnik (sports society) athletes
Honoured Masters of Sport of the USSR
Latvian people of Russian descent